Q32 may refer to:
 Q32 (New York City bus)
 AN/FSQ-32, an American military computer
 As-Sajdah, the 32nd surah of the Quran
 , a Naïade-class submarine

Letter-number combination disambiguation pages